tokidoki ("sometimes" in Japanese) is the Japanese-inspired lifestyle brand created in 2006 by Italian artist Simone Legno and his business partners Pooneh Mohajer and Ivan Arnold.  They produce apparel, footwear, accessories and other products using art, cartoon characters and the logo designed by Simone Legno.

Lines of toys include: Cactus Friends, Donutella and Her Sweet Friends, Unicorno, Moofia, Mermicorno, Til Death, and Punkstar.

History
In April 2005, the co-founder of cosmetics company Hard Candy, Pooneh Mohajer, and her husband Ivan Arnold, saw Simone Legno's personal portfolio website, which had some popularity, being listed as one of The Independent's top ten "websites of the week". They subsequently arranged to meet him, and Simone joined them in Los Angeles. Simone has become a recent fixture at the San Diego Comic Con and makes appearances at various locations worldwide for signings and promotions.

References

External links 
Official tokidoki website
tokidoki for MetroPCS
Tokidoki article in the Honolulu Star-Bulletin

Companies based in Los Angeles
Companies established in 2005
2005 establishments in California